Raoul Curiel (born 23 June 1913, Cairo, Egypt; d. 23 February 2000 Paris, France) was a French archaeologist, egyptologist and orientalist.

Early life and education 
Curiel was born into a prosperous Jewish family in Cairo, the son of Daniel Curiel, a wealthy banker, and brother of Henri Curiel. In 1933, Curiel left Cairo to study law at the University of Paris (or Sorbonne), but switched to Indology and Iranian studies.

In 1939 he cofounded a weekly, Don Quichotte, together with his brother Henri Curiel and Georges Henein.

Archaeology and Indology 
During the Second World War, Curiel served in Beirut, where he carried out archaeological studies for the French army. In Beirut, he became friends with Daniel Schlumberger and Henri Seyrig. Curiel was the French archaeological representative in Afghanistan in 1945 and served as Director of Antiques at the National Museum of Pakistan, 1954–1958. He later acted as curator of the Oriental coins department at the French National Library.

Bibliography 

 Trésors monétaires d'Afghanistan: Mémoires de la Délégation Archéologique Française en Afghanistan (Paris, 1953)
Une collection de monnaies de cuivre Arabo-Sasanides (Paris, 1984)

References

External links 

 Raoul Curiel obituary in Le Monde

1913 births
2000 deaths
Egyptian people of Italian-Jewish descent
Egyptian Sephardi Jews
20th-century French Sephardi Jews
French archaeologists
French orientalists
French Egyptologists
Egyptian orientalists
Egyptian archaeologists
Egyptian Egyptologists
20th-century archaeologists
Egyptian emigrants to France